Magneton may refer to:
 Bohr magneton, a physical constant of magnetic moment named after Niels Bohr
 Nuclear magneton, a physical constant of magnetic moment
 Parson magneton, a hypothetical object in atomic physics suggested by Alfred Lauck Parson in 1915
 Weiss magneton, an experimentally derived unit of magnetic moment suggested in 1911 by Pierre-Ernest Weiss
 Magneton, a term that some physicists use for magnetic monopole
 Magneton (Pokémon), a Pokémon species
 Magneton, an album by The Octagon Man